Chandipur Assembly constituency is an assembly constituency in Purba Medinipur district in the Indian state of West Bengal.

Overview
As per orders of the Delimitation Commission, No. 211 Chandipur Assembly constituency is composed of the following: Chandipur community development block, and Benodia, Bivisanpur, Gurgram, Kakra, Mahammadpur I and Mahammadpur II gram panchayats of Bhagabanpur I community development block.

Chandipur Assembly constituency is part of No. 31 Kanthi (Lok Sabha constituency).

Members of Legislative Assembly

Election results

2021

2016

2011

References

Assembly constituencies of West Bengal
Politics of Purba Medinipur district